Tullik Helsing (12 December 1918 – 18 January 1994) was a Norwegian sports diver. She was born in Meldal. She competed at the 1936 Summer Olympics in Berlin, where she placed 13th in platform.

References

1918 births
1994 deaths
People from Meldal
Norwegian female divers
Olympic divers of Norway
Divers at the 1936 Summer Olympics
Sportspeople from Trøndelag